Postal codes in the People's Republic of China are postal codes used by China Post for the delivery of letters and goods within mainland China.

China Post uses a six-digit all-numerical system with four tiers: the first tier, composed of the first two digits, show the province, province-equivalent municipality, or autonomous region; the second tier, composed of the third digit, shows the postal zone within the province, municipality or autonomous region; the fourth digit serves as the third tier, which shows the postal office within prefectures or prefecture-level cities; the last two digits are the fourth tier, which indicates the specific mailing area for delivery.

The range 000000–009999 was originally marked for Taiwan (The Republic of China) but is not used because it not under the control of the People's Republic of China. Mail to ROC is treated as international mail, and uses postal codes set forth by Chunghwa Post.

Codes starting from 999 are the internal codes used by China Post for handling international (including the SARs and Taiwan) mails, and not used by the general public.

External links 
 China Post - Postcode query 
 Name Address Database of China Post 
 Chinese National Philatelic Corporation Postal Codes in China (in English, incomplete)
 China Zip Code Search at www.ChinaTour360.com
 Hong Kong postal addressing
 China Postal Code

China
Postal codes
Postal system of China